Michael Creighton Balfour (11 February 1918 – 24 October 1997) was an English actor, working mainly in British films and TV, following his TV debut in the BBC's The Marvellous History of St Bernard, in 1938. He was a recognisable face, often in small character parts and supporting roles, in nearly two hundred films and TV shows, from the 1940s to the 1990s, often playing comical heavies or otherwise shady characters notable for their "loud" clothes, sometimes convincingly cast as an American.

He worked for a roll call of film directors, including Tony Richardson, Pete Walker, Billy Wilder, Lewis Gilbert, Roman Polanski, Leslie Norman, Tim Burton, John Frankenheimer, François Truffaut, John Gilling, Stanley Donen, Ken Annakin, Cavalcanti, Lance Comfort, Terence Young, Gerald Thomas, Pasolini, John Paddy Carstairs, Terence Fisher, Val Guest, Frank Launder, John Huston, Basil Dearden and Howard Hawks.

Balfour had parts in many popular TV shows of the era including Educated Evans, Mess Mates, Danger Man, The Avengers, Hancock's Half Hour, Dixon of Dock Green, Rogue's Gallery, Z-Cars, The Onedin Line, and the detective drama The Vise, playing Saber's assistant Barney O'Keefe.

Balfour was also known as the passenger in the car driven by actor Bonar Colleano when it crashed, killing Colleano. Balfour's injuries required him to have 98 stitches, but he was released from hospital in time to attend Colleano's funeral.

As his screen career began to slow down in the late 1970s, Michael Balfour went on tour with European circuses, as a clown. He founded Circus Hazzard, and created his own clown character. His son later became a circus manager.

As well as performing, Balfour was a dedicated painter and sculptor, and in later years turned increasingly to sculpture and the arts, even running his own gallery for a while. For his subjects, he frequently drew on his own family career as a circus clown.

Selected filmography

 Just William's Luck (1948) as Jenks
 No Orchids for Miss Blandish (1948) as Barney
 Sleeping Car to Trieste (1948) as Spiegel (uncredited)
 Woman Hater (1948) as Reporter (uncredited)
 The Small Voice (1948) as Frankie
 William Comes to Town (1948) as Stall-holder
 Stop Press Girl (1949) as Crook (uncredited)
 Don't Ever Leave Me (1949) as Jim Kennedy
 Helter Skelter (1949) as Barman (uncredited)
 Melody Club (1949) as Max
 Obsession (1949) as American sailor
 I Was a Male War Bride (1949) as Male Billet Sergeant (uncredited)
 Prelude to Fame (1950) as Lucio
 Cage of Gold (1950) as American Soldier (uncredited)
 Her Favourite Husband (1950) as Pete
 Blackout (1950) as Tom (uncredited)
 The Quiet Woman (1951) as Lefty
 A Case for PC 49 (1951) as Chubby Price
 13 East Street (1952) as Joey Long
 Venetian Bird (1952) as Moretto
 Top Secret (1952) as Jersey Sailor
 Moulin Rouge (1952) as Dodo (uncredited)
 Hot Ice (1952) as Jacobson
 Three Steps to the Gallows (1953) as Carter - boxing fan
 Genevieve (1953) as Trumpeter (uncredited)
 The Steel Key (1953) as Sailor (uncredited)
 The Captain's Paradise (1953) as Customs official No. 2
 Johnny on the Run (1953) as Fingers
 The Red Beret (1953) as American Sergeant
 Recoil (1953) as Parkes
 Park Plaza 605 (1953) as Ted Birston
 Three's Company (1953) as The Drunk (segment "Take a Number' story)
 Albert R.N. (1953) as Hank
 Black 13 (1953) as Joe
 Small Town Story (1953) as Turner (uncredited)
 Love in Pawn (1953) as Alaric
 Escape by Night (1953) as Bearded Reporter (uncredited)
 River Beat (1954) as Adams
 The Diamond (1954) as Hoxie
 The Scarlet Web (1954) as Coffee Stallkeeper (uncredited)
 Delayed Action (1954) as Honey
 The Belles of St. Trinian's (1954) as Bus Driver (uncredited)
 The Sea Shall Not Have Them (1954) as Dray
 Devil's Point (1954) as Bennett, short henchman
 Impulse (1954) as Sailor (uncredited)
 Delavine Affair (1955) as Sammy
 One Good Turn (1955) as Boxing Booth Spectator (uncredited)
 The Gilded Cage (1955) as USAF staff (uncredited)
 Track the Man Down (1955) (uncredited)
 Barbados Quest (1955) as Barney Wilson
 Reluctant Bride (1955) as Boxer
 Gentlemen Marry Brunettes (1955) as Stage Doorman
 Secret Venture (1955) as Stevens
 It's a Great Day (1956) as Charlie Mead's Mate
 The Secret of the Forest (1956) as Len
 Reach for the Sky (1956) as Orderly (uncredited)
 Breakaway (1956) as Barney
 The Big Money (1956) as 'Wilberforce'
 Hour of Decision (1957) as Barman
 Quatermass 2 (1957) as Harry
 The Steel Bayonet (1957) as Pvt. Thomas
 Light Fingers (1957) as The Major
 Man from Tangier (1957) as Spade Murphy
 Fiend Without a Face (1958) as Sgt. Kasper
 Look Back in Anger (1959) as Picky Shopper (uncredited)
 The Flesh and the Fiends (1960) as Drunken Sailor
 Sink the Bismarck! (1960) as Able Seaman - Lookout on 'Suffolk' (uncredited)
 Carry On Constable (1960) as Matt 
 Too Hot to Handle (1960) as Tourist guide
 Make Mine Mink (1960) as Rowson's Butler
 Surprise Package (1960) as Oscar (uncredited)
 The Hellfire Club (1961) as John - Juggler (uncredited)
 The Monster of Highgate Ponds (1961) as Bert
 The Treasure of Monte Cristo (1961) as Pepe
 Pit of Darkness (1961) as Fisher
 Design for Loving (1962) as Bernie
 She Always Gets Their Man (1962) as Runkle
 The Fast Lady (1962) as Bandit #2
 The Rescue Squad (1963) as Barrow-Boy
 Echo of Diana (1963) as Newsagent
 A Stitch in Time (1963) as Workman with Mallet (uncredited)
 Five Have a Mystery to Solve (1964) as Emilio
 The Sicilians (1964) as Stage Door Keeper
 Strangler's Web (1965) as John Vichelski
 The Sandwich Man (1966) as Workman (uncredited)
 Kaleidoscope (1966) as Poker Player #4
 Where the Bullets Fly (1966) as Band Leader
 Fahrenheit 451 (1966) as Book Person: Machiavelli's 'The Prince' (uncredited)
 Press for Time (1966) as Sewerman
 Trouble with Junia (1967) as Joe Pennyworth
 The Fixer (1968) as Boatman (uncredited)
 The Oblong Box (1969) as Ruddock
 Hoverbug (1969) as Mr. Gutteridge
 The Adventurers (1970) as Detective
 The Private Life of Sherlock Holmes (1970) as Cabby
 Macbeth (1971) as First Murderer
 Man of Violence (1971) as Cafe Owner
 All Coppers Are... (1972) as Heart attack victim (uncredited)
 The Canterbury Tales (1972) as The Carpenter (segment the Miller's Tale)
 Wreck Raisers (1972) as Mr. Trevor
 The Copter Kids (1976) as Benny Baker
 Joseph Andrews (1977) as Ruffian 
 Come Play with Me (1977) as Nosher
 Candleshoe (1977) as Mr. McCress
 The Stick Up (1977) as Sam
 The Prisoner of Zenda (1979) as Luger
 The Holcroft Covenant (1985) as Hard Hat
 Batman (1989) as Axis Chemicals scientist
 The Krays (1990) as Referee
 Revenge of Billy the Kid (1992) as Gyles MacDonald (final film role)

References

External links
 

20th-century English male actors
English male film actors
English male television actors
English male stage actors
People from Dover, Kent
Male actors from Kent
1918 births
1997 deaths
Deaths from cancer in England
20th-century British sculptors
English male sculptors